The following is a list of Israeli ambassadors to Eritrea:

Gadi Harpaz, 2016– 
Elie Antebi, 2013–2016
Guy Feldman, 2010–2013
Menahem Kanafi, 2005–2008
Hanan Goder-Goldberger, 2002–2005
Uri Savir, 2001–2005
Nathan Meron, 2000–2002
Raphael Walden, 1997–1999
Ariel Cerem, 1993–1996

References

Eritrea
Israel